Dimenticare Palermo (Forgetting Palermo) is a 1989 Italian political thriller film starring Jim Belushi, directed by Francesco Rosi and co-written by Gore Vidal. The film was released under the title The Palermo Connection in North America. The script is based on the Prix Goncourt winning novel Oublier Palerme (1966) by French author Edmonde Charles-Roux.

Plot

Carmine Bonavia is candidate for mayor of New York City on the issue of drug legalization. During the campaign he gets married and travels to his ancestral home of Sicily, for the honeymoon. In the hotel in Palermo he meets a Sicilian prince who has been confined there for years because he crossed the mafia. He discovers the beauties of the Italian island but is also framed by men of power, for a crime he did not commit. He discovers that those men will stop at nothing to prevent the legalization of drugs, which threatens their business, and is forced to decide between joining them or going to prison.

Cast
 James Belushi: Carmine Bonavia
 Mimi Rogers: Carrie
 Joss Ackland: the boss
 Vittorio Gassman: the 'Prince'
 Philippe Noiret: Gianni Mucci
 Carolina Rosi: the Italian journalist
 Beatrice Ring: the German student
 Marco Leonardi: the florist
 Marino Masé
 Sal Borgese

References

External links

1989 films
1980s Italian-language films
English-language Italian films
1980s English-language films
Films set in Sicily
Films about the Sicilian Mafia
Films directed by Francesco Rosi
Films with screenplays by Gore Vidal
Films scored by Ennio Morricone
1989 thriller films
Films with screenplays by Tonino Guerra
Films based on French novels
1989 multilingual films
Italian multilingual films
1980s Italian films